Elections to the Algerian Assembly were held in Algeria in February 1954. Like other post-1948 elections in French Algeria, it was rigged by the authorities to ensure the defeat of Algerian nationalists.

Electoral system
The Assembly was elected by two colleges, each of which elected 60 seats. The First College consisted of Europeans and évolués, whilst the Second College was composed of the remainder of the Algerian population.

Results

References

Elections in Algeria
1954 in Algeria
Algeria
Election and referendum articles with incomplete results